The T-1 tractor (also known as DT-1, Direcția Tehnică 1)  was a project developed by the Romanian Army during World War II. A total of 1,000 were ordered. It was designed to tow a Romanian 75 mm gun. After five prototypes were produced, the project was canceled due to the lack of priority.

Specifications 
The T-1 weighed 7 tons (7.7 short tons)  and could carry up to 4 tons and tow as much as 6 tons. It had a 4-cylinder 56 kilowatt (75 hp) engine and transmission consisting of five gears. It could go up to 32 km/h (20 mph) and had a power-to-weight ratio of 10.7 hp/tonne.

Development 
The Romanian General Staff ordered the construction of 1,000 tractors between 1944 and 1945 at the Ford truck plant in Bucharest. The vehicles were officially designated as T-1 (Tractor 1). It was also named the "DT-1". It was going to be used as a prime mover towing the Romanian-built 75 mm antitank gun Reşiţa Model 1943.

Production 
The vehicle was based on the STZ agricultural tractor. Only five prototypes were built, because the "Mareşal" tank destroyer project had more priority.

Notes

References 
 Axworthy, Mark; Scafeș, Cornel;  Crăciunoiu, Cristian (1995). Third Axis. Fourth Ally. Romanian Armed Forces in the European War, 1941–1945, Arms and Armour, London. 
 Romanian Parliament (1990). Monitorul oficial al României. Partea a III-a, Publicații și anunțuri. Bucharest: Romanian Government. 
 Tudor, Gheorghe (1982). Forța de șoc. Schiță istorică a trupelor de tancuri din armata română, Editura Militară, București.

Artillery tractors
World War II armoured fighting vehicles of Romania
Military history of Romania during World War II